The 2013 Nottingham Challenge (known for sponsorship reasons as the Aegon Nottingham Challenge) was a professional tennis tournament played on outdoor grass courts. It was the third edition of the tournament which was part of the 2013 ATP Challenger Tour and the 2013 ITF Women's Circuit. It took place in Nottingham, United Kingdom, on 10–16 June 2013.

ATP entrants

Singles

Seeds 

 1 Rankings as of 27 May 2013

Other entrants 
The following players received wildcards into the singles main draw:
  Richard Gabb
  Joshua Milton
  David Rice
  Daniel Smethurst

The following players received entry from the qualifying draw:
  Adrien Bossel
  George Coupland
  Brydan Klein
  Joshua Ward-Hibbert

The following player received entry as a lucky loser:
  Dzmitry Zhyrmont

Doubles

Seeds 

 1 Rankings as of 27 May 2013

Other entrants 
The following pairs received wildcards into the doubles main draw:
  Flavio Cipolla /  Filip Peliwo
  David Rice /  Sean Thornley
  Ken Skupski /  Neal Skupski

WTA entrants

Seeds 

 1 Rankings as of 27 May 2013

Other entrants 
The following players received wildcards into the singles main draw:
  Elena Baltacha
  Naomi Broady
  Samantha Murray
  Lisa Whybourn

The following players received entry from the qualifying draw:
  Noppawan Lertcheewakarn
  Miki Miyamura
  Sara Sorribes Tormo
  Emily Webley-Smith

Champions

Men's singles 

  Steve Johnson def.  Ruben Bemelmans 7–5, 7–5

Women's singles 

  Elena Baltacha def.  Tadeja Majerič 7–5, 7–6(9–7)

Men's doubles 

  Sanchai Ratiwatana /  Sonchat Ratiwatana def.  Purav Raja /  Divij Sharan, 7–6(7–5), 6–7(3–7), [10–8]

Women's doubles 

  Julie Coin /  Stéphanie Foretz Gacon def.  Julia Glushko /  Erika Sema 6–2, 6–4

External links 
 

2013
2013 ATP Challenger Tour
2013 ITF Women's Circuit
2013 in English tennis
2010s in Nottingham
June 2013 sports events in the United Kingdom